Sanischare may refer to:

Sanischare, Kosi, Nepal
Sanischare, Mechi, Nepal